Spartaeus spinimanus, the spiny-legged jumper, is a species of spider of the genus Spartaeus. It is found from Sri Lanka to Borneo, and Sumbawa. The most preferred prey is moths, where the spider builds large sheet webs on tree trunks to capture them.

References

Salticidae
Spiders of Asia
Spiders described in 1878